A type of study used in economics, sociology, political science, and psychology, an audit study is one in which trained employees of the researcher ("auditors") are matched on all characteristics except the one being tested for discrimination. These auditors then apply for a service, be it a job, financial advice regarding their stock portfolio, housing, or a credit card, to test for discrimination.

Applications
Audit studies have been conducted to test the existence of discrimination in numerous occupations and services and in regards to multiple characteristics. For example, studies have been conducted to measure discrimination against racial minorities by real estate agents, as well as gender discrimination against women applying for restaurant jobs. Most employment-related audit studies have focused on overqualified college students applying for low-paying jobs during the summer. They have also been used to measure racial and gender discrimination in academia, racial discrimination in the low and high ends of the labor market, discrimination in social integration,  and racial/ethnic discrimination in roommate selection.

Criticism
Audit studies have been criticized because the auditors may look different to employers, and this may result in the appearance of discrimination when employers were really just making decisions based on appearance. The other limitations of these studies, according to their critics, include that they are unable to audit jobs found through interactions with other people directly, only those found through newspapers. Additionally, others have noted the lack of standardization of signals (primarily names) to indicate race through correspondence (e.g., resumes and emails).

References

Personnel economics
Discrimination
Research methods
Experimental economics